Hassan Askiali Haskins Jr. (born November 26, 1999) is an American football running back for the Tennessee Titans of the National Football League (NFL). He played college football at Michigan.

Early years
In addition to playing football at Eureka High School in Eureka, Missouri, Haskins participated in basketball and track and field. Haskins placed second in the high jump at the 2017 MSHSAA Class 5 State Championship, clearing 6' 7". As a senior, he led the basketball team in blocks and steals while averaging 8.1 points per game. As a junior on the football team, Haskins had 242 carries, 1,509 yards, and 19 rushing touchdowns to go along with 2 receiving touchdowns and one passing touchdown. He added 12 sacks and a fumble recovery as a defensive end. As a senior, he had 255 carries, 2,197 yards, and 31 rushing touchdowns with 2 receiving touchdowns. He also contributed on defense with 9 sacks and two fumble recoveries, one of which he returned for a 50-yard touchdown.

Haskins was lightly recruited by Power Five football programs. He ran a 4.74 second 40-yard dash in high school, and his speed could be a reason for his under-rating. Said Haskins' high school assistant coach Tyler Wasson, "There was a 1-AA team that would e-mail us, 'Well, he doesn't fit our system. He's not fast enough.'" When Michigan was recruiting Haskins, he was the nation's 82nd best running back and well outside the top 1,000 recruits in the class. Haskins committed to Michigan on October 29, 2017, as a three-star running back. He ended the recruitment cycle as the no. 975 overall recruit after he signed with Michigan.

College career

In his redshirt freshman year, Haskins agreed to move to defense to play linebacker. In 2019, with the graduation of Karan Higdon and the suspension of Chris Evans, Haskins moved back to running back to improve the depth at the position. Haskins had his breakout game on October 12, 2019, when he carried 12 times for 125 yards with his first collegiate touchdown against Illinois. In his first collegiate start on October 26, 2019, against Notre Dame, Haskins had 20 carries for 149 yards, including a 49-yard long rush. He finished the 2019 season with 121 carries for 622 yards and four touchdowns. Haskins claimed that spending time at linebacker gave him a better vision of the running lanes and helped him see what opposing defenses were trying to do.

On November 27, 2021, in a game against Ohio State, Haskins recorded five rushing touchdowns. Haskins finished the regular season with 1,232 rushing yards on 244 carries (an average of 5.0 yards per carry) and tied for second in program history with 18 single-season rushing touchdowns (tying Anthony Thomas and Chris Perry). He was selected as a first-team running back on the 2021 All-Big Ten football team. With two rushing touchdowns in the 2021 Big Ten Football Championship Game, Haskins set the single-season program record with 20 rushing touchdowns, surpassing the previous record of 19 set by Ron Johnson in 1968. At that point, he carried the ball 443 times since 2019 without a single fumble – the most in college football over the span.

College statistics

Professional career

Haskins was drafted by the Tennessee Titans in the fourth round, 131st overall, of the 2022 NFL Draft. On December 29, while helping fill in for injured Derrick Henry, Haskins rushed 12 times for 40 yards and caught two of three targets for 13 yards during a 27-13 Week 17 loss to the Dallas Cowboys.

Personal life
Haskins' older brother Maurice Alexander was drafted in the fourth round by the St. Louis Rams in the 2014 NFL Draft.

References

External links
 Tennessee Titans bio
 Michigan Wolverines bio

1999 births
Living people
American football running backs
Michigan Wolverines football players
Players of American football from St. Louis
Tennessee Titans players